MaveriX is an Australian drama TV series aimed at children and young teenagers which premiered on ABC Me on 1 April 2022. The series follows the story of a group of junior motocross riders who are selected for the first ever MaveriX Academy in Alice Springs, the home of dirtbike racing in Australia. The six teens are pushed to their limits, and the academy ultimately gives them the chance to join a professional racing team.

Production
MaveriX is written by Sam Meikle, Fin Edquist, Michelle Offen and Kelly Schilling. The 10-part series is produced by Rachel Clements and Trisha Morton-Thomas at Brindle Films. The executive producers are Bernadette O’Mahony and creators Rachel Clements, Sam Meikle and Isaac Elliott. MaveriX was filmed in Alice Springs in 2021.

Cast
 Darcy Tadich as Scott 
 Tatiana Goode as Jenny 
 Sam Winspear-Schillings as Bear
 Tjiirdm McGuire as Richie
 Sebastian Tang as Kaden
 Charlotte Maggi as Angelique 
 Jane Harber as Tanya
 Rohan Nichol as Griffo
 Kelton Pell as Vic Simmons

Episodes

References

External links 
 

Australian children's television series
Australian Broadcasting Corporation original programming
2020s teen drama television series
2022 Australian television series debuts
Motorcycle television series
English-language Netflix original programming
Netflix children's programming
Television series about teenagers
Television shows set in the Northern Territory